John James Hope-Johnstone, 8th Earl of Annandale and Hartfell  (5 October 1842 – 26 December 1912) was a Scottish Conservative Party politician.

At the 1874 general election Johnstone was elected as the Member of Parliament (MP) for Dumfriesshire. He did not stand again at the 1880 general election.

He was de jure 8th Earl of Annandale and Hartfell.

References

External links 
 
 

1841 births
1912 deaths
John
Scottish Tory MPs (pre-1912)
UK MPs 1874–1880
19th-century Scottish people
Earls of Annandale and Hartfell